Louis Farrakhan (born Louis Eugene Walcott, May 11, 1933) is an American black supremacist and anti-white religious leader who heads the Nation of Islam (NOI). Prior to joining the NOI, he was a calypso singer who used the stage name Calypso Gene. Earlier in his career, he served as the minister of mosques in Boston and Harlem and was appointed National Representative of the Nation of Islam by then NOI leader Elijah Muhammad. He adopted the name Louis X, before being named Louis Farrakhan.

After Warith Deen Mohammed reorganized the original NOI into the orthodox Sunni Islamic group American Society of Muslims, Farrakhan began to rebuild the NOI as "Final Call". In 1981, he officially adopted the name "Nation of Islam", reviving the group and establishing its headquarters at Mosque Maryam. The Nation of Islam is an organization which the Southern Poverty Law Center (SPLC) describes as a hate group. Farrakhan’s antisemitic statements and views have been condemned by the SPLC, the Anti-Defamation League (ADL), and other monitoring organizations. According to the SPLC, the NOI promotes a "fundamentally anti-white theology" amounting to an "innate black superiority over whites". Farrakhan's views and remarks have also been called homophobic. He has disputed these assertions.

In October 1995, he organized and led the Million Man March in Washington, D.C. Due to health issues, he reduced his responsibilities with the NOI in 2007. However, Farrakhan has continued to deliver sermons and speak at NOI events.  In 2015, he led the 20th Anniversary of the Million Man March: Justice or Else. 

Farrakhan was banned from Facebook in 2019 along with other public figures considered to be extremists.

Early life and education
Farrakhan was born Louis Eugene Walcott on May 11, 1933, in The Bronx, New York City, the younger of two sons of Sarah Mae Manning (1900–1988) and Percival Clark, immigrants from the Anglo-Caribbean islands. His mother was born in Saint Kitts, while his father was Jamaican. The couple separated before their second son was born, and Farrakhan says he never knew his biological father.

In a 1996 interview with Henry Louis Gates Jr., he speculated that his biological father, "a light-skinned man with straight hair from Jamaica", may have been Jewish.

After his stepfather died in 1936, the Walcott family moved to Boston, where they settled in the largely African-American neighborhood of Roxbury.

Walcott received his first violin at the age of five and by the time he was 12 years old, he had been on tour with the Boston College Orchestra. A year later, he participated in national competitions and won them. In 1946, he was one of the first black performers to appear on the Ted Mack Original Amateur Hour, where he also won an award. Walcott and his family were active members of the Episcopal St. Cyprian's Church in Roxbury.

Walcott attended the Boston Latin School, and later the English High School, from which he graduated. He completed three years at Winston-Salem Teachers College, where he had a track scholarship.
In 1953, Walcott married Betsy Ross (later known as Khadijah Farrakhan) while he was in college. Due to complications from his new wife's first pregnancy, Walcott dropped out after completing his junior year of college to devote time to his wife and their child. Farrakhan is the father of 9 children and grandfather of basketball player Mustapha Farrakhan Jr.

Career and activities (1953–1996)
In the 1950s, Walcott began his professional music career as a singer billed as "The Charmer". At this point, earning $500 a week, Walcott was touring the northeastern and midwestern United States, sometimes also using the nickname "Calypso Gene". In 1953–1954, preceding Harry Belafonte's success with his album Calypso (released in 1956), he recorded and released a dozen cheeky, funny tunes as "The Charmer" in a mixed mento/calypso style, including "Ugly Woman", "Stone Cold Man" and calypso standards like "Zombie Jamboree", "Hol 'Em Joe", "Mary Ann" and "Brown Skin Girl". Some were reissued: "Don’t Touch Me Nylon" has mild, explicit sexual lyrics as well as "Female Boxer", which contains some sexist overtones and "Is She Is, Or Is She Ain't" (inspired by Christine Jorgensen's sex change operation).

In February 1955, he was headlining a show in Chicago, Illinois, called Calypso Follies. There he first came in contact with the teachings of the Nation of Islam (NOI) through Rodney Smith, a friend and saxophonist from Boston. Walcott and his wife Betsy were invited to the Nation of Islam's annual Saviours' Day address by Elijah Muhammad. Prior to going to Saviours' Day, due to then-Minister Malcolm X's media presence, Walcott had never heard of Elijah Muhammad, and like many outside of the Nation of Islam, he thought that Malcolm X was the leader of the Nation of Islam.

In 1955, Walcott fulfilled the requirements to be a registered Muslim/registered believer/registered laborer. He memorized and recited verbatim the 10 questions and answers of the NOI's Student Enrollment. He then wrote a Saviour's Letter that must be sent to the NOI's headquarters in Chicago. The Saviour's Letter must be copied verbatim, and have the identical handwriting of the Nation of Islam's founder, Wallace Fard Muhammad.

After having the Saviour's Letter reviewed, and approved by the NOI's headquarters in Chicago in July 1955, Walcott received a letter of approval from the Nation of Islam acknowledging his official membership as a registered Muslim/registered believer/registered laborer in the NOI. As a result, he received his "X." The "X" was considered a placeholder, used to indicate that Nation of Islam members' original African family names had been lost. They acknowledged that European surnames were slave names, assigned by the slaveowners in order to mark their ownership. Members of the NOI used the "X" while they were waiting for their Islamic names, which some NOI members received later in their conversions.

Hence, Louis Walcott became Louis X. Elijah Muhammad then replaced his "X" with the "holy name" Farrakhan, which is a corruption of the Arabic word فرقان furqan, which means "The Criterion". On a very different tone from his calypso songs, he recorded two tunes as Louis X, criticizing racism in A White Man's Heaven Is a Black Man's Hell, a record album which was issued on Boston's A Moslem Sings label in 1960. The summer after Farrakhan's conversion, Elijah Muhammad stated that all musicians in the NOI had to choose between music and the Nation of Islam.

After nine months of being a registered Muslim in the NOI and a member of Muhammad's Temple of Islam in Boston, where Malcolm X was the minister, Farrakhan became his assistant minister. Eventually he became the official minister after Elijah Muhammad transferred Malcolm X to Muhammad's Temple of Islam No. 7 on West 116th St. in Harlem, New York City. Louis X continued to be mentored by Malcolm X, until the latter's assassination in 1965.

The day that Malcolm X died in Harlem, Farrakhan happened to be in Newark, New Jersey on rotation, 45 minutes away from where Malcolm X was assassinated. After Malcolm X's death, Elijah Muhammad appointed Farrakhan to the two prominent positions that Malcolm held before being dismissed from the NOI. Farrakhan became the national spokesman/national representative of the NOI and was appointed minister of the influential Harlem Mosque (Temple), where he served until 1975.

Farrakhan made numerous incendiary statements about Malcolm X, contributing to what was called a "climate of vilification." Three men from a Newark, NOI mosque—Thomas Hagan, Muhammad Abdul Aziz (aka Norman 3X Butler) and Kahlil Islam (aka Thomas 15X Johnson)—were convicted of the killing and served prison sentences. Only Hagan ever admitted his role.

Leadership of the Nation of Islam
Warith Deen Mohammed, the seventh son of Elijah and Clara Muhammad, was declared the new leader of the Nation of Islam at the annual Saviours' Day Convention in February 1975, a day after his father died. He made substantial changes in the organization in the late 1970s, taking most of its members into a closer relationship with orthodox Islam, and renaming the group "World Community of Islam in the West", and eventually renaming it the American Society of Muslims, to indicate the apparent changes which had occurred in the group. He rejected the deification of the Nation of Islam's founder Wallace D. Fard as Allah in person, the Mahdi of the Holy Qur'an and the messiah of the Bible, welcomed white worshipers who were once considered devils and enemies in the NOI as equal brothers, sisters, and friends. At the beginning of these changes, Chief Min. Warith Deen Mohammed gave some Euro-Americans X's, and he extended efforts at inter-religious cooperation and outreach to Christians and Jews. He changed his position and title from Chief Minister Wallace Muhammad to Imam Warith Huddin Mohammad, and finally changed them to Imam Warith Al-Deen Mohammed.

Farrakhan joined Mohammed's movement and followed Imam Warith Al-Deen Mohammed, and eventually became a Sunni Imam under him for  years from 1975 to 1978. Imam Mohammed gave Imam Farrakhan the name Abdul-Haleem. In 1978, Imam Farrakhan distanced himself from Mohammed's movement. In a 1990 interview with Emerge magazine, Farrakhan said that he had become disillusioned with Mohammed's movement and decided to "quietly walk away" from it rather than cause a schism among its members. In 1978, Farrakhan and a small number of supporters decided to rebuild what they considered the original Nation of Islam upon the foundations established by Wallace Fard Muhammad, and Elijah Muhammad. This decision was made without public announcement.

In 1979, Farrakhan's group founded a weekly newspaper entitled The Final Call, which was intended to be similar to the original Muhammad Speaks newspaper that Malcolm X claimed to have started, Farrakhan had a weekly column in The Final Call. In 1981, Farrakhan and his supporters held their first Saviours' Day convention in Chicago, Illinois, and took back the name of the Nation of Islam. The event was similar to the earlier Nation's celebrations, last held in Chicago on February 26, 1975. At the convention's keynote address, Farrakhan announced his attempt to restore the Nation of Islam under Elijah Muhammad's teachings.

On October 24, 1989, at a press conference at the J.W. Marriott Hotel in Washington, DC, Minister Farrakhan described a vision which he had on September 17, 1985 in Tepoztlán, Mexico. In this 'Vision-like' experience he was carried up to "a Wheel, or what you call an unidentified flying object", as in the Bible's Book of Ezekiel. During this experience, he heard the voice of Elijah Muhammad, the leader of the Nation of Islam.

He said in the press conference that Elijah Muhammad "spoke in short cryptic sentences and as he spoke a scroll full of cursive writing rolled down in front of my eyes, but it was a projection of what was being written in my mind. As I attempted to read the cursive writing, which was in English, the scroll disappeared and the Honorable Elijah Muhammad began to speak to me." [Elijah Muhammad said], "President Reagan has met with the Joint Chiefs of Staff to plan a war. I want you to hold a press conference in Washington, D.C., and announce their plan and say to the world that you got the information from me, Elijah Muhammad, on the Wheel."

During that same press conference Farrakhan stated that he believed his "experience" was proven: "In 1987, in The New York Times Sunday magazine and on the front page of The Atlanta Constitution, the truth of my vision was verified, for the headlines of The Atlanta Constitution read, 'President Reagan Planned War Against Libya.'" Farrakhan added "In the article which followed, the exact words that the Honorable Elijah Muhammad spoke to me on the Wheel were found; that the President had met with the Joint Chiefs of Staff and planned a war against Libya in the early part of September 1985."

Qubilah Shabazz, the daughter of Malcolm X and Betty Shabazz, was arrested on January 12, 1995 accused of conspiracy to assassinate Farrakhan in retaliation for the murder of her father, for which she believed he was responsible. According to Stanford University historian Clayborne Carson, "[her family] resented Farrakhan and had good reason to because he was one of those in the Nation responsible for the climate of vilification that resulted in Malcolm X's assassination". Some critics later alleged that the FBI had used paid informant Michael Fitzpatrick to frame Shabazz, who was four years old when her father was killed. Nearly four months later, on May 1, Shabazz accepted a plea agreement under which she maintained her innocence but accepted responsibility for her actions.

Farrakhan visited Turkey at invitation on February 18, 1996 and met with the country's leading Islamist political figure, Necmettin Erbakan, and his Welfare Party's officials. He said that the Turkish people must decide whether it wants to have a secular or Islamic government.

Million Man March
That year in October, Farrakhan convened a broad coalition of what he and his supporters claimed was one million men in Washington, D.C., for the Million Man March. The count however fell far below the hoped-for numbers. The National Park Service estimated that approximately 440,000 were in attendance. Farrakhan threatened to sue the National Park Service because of the low estimate from the Park Police.

Farrakhan and other speakers called for black men to renew their commitments to their families and communities. In Farrakhan's 2 hours he quoted from spirituals as well as the Old and New Testaments and termed himself a prophet sent by God to show America its evil. The event was organized by many civil rights and religious organizations and drew men and their sons from across the United States of America. Many other distinguished African Americans addressed the throng, including: Maya Angelou; Rosa Parks; Martin Luther King III, Cornel West, Jesse Jackson and Benjamin Chavis. In 2005, together with other prominent African Americans such as the New Black Panther Party leader Malik Zulu Shabazz, the activist Al Sharpton, Addis Daniel and others, Farrakhan marked the 10th anniversary of the Million Man March by holding a second gathering, the Millions More Movement, October 14–17 in Washington D.C.

Views

Racism and black nationalism 
The Anti-Defamation League classifies Farrakhan as a racist and the Southern Poverty Law Center considers the Nation of Islam (NOI) as a hate group and a black nationalist organization. According to the SPLC, the NOI's theology claims black superiority over whites. According to the NOI, whites were created 6,600 years ago as a "race of devils" by an evil scientist named Yakub, a story which originated with the founder of the NOI, Wallace D. Fard.

The split in the NOI into two factions after Eljiah Muhammad died in 1975, was caused in part because new leader Warith Mohammed  wished to reject the Yakub myth, while national spokesman Farrakhan wanted to reaffirm it. At an event in Milwaukee in August 2015, Farrakhan said: "White people deserve to die, and they know, so they think it’s us coming to do it".

Antisemitism

Both the Anti-Defamation League and Southern Poverty Law Center classify Farrakhan as an antisemite. Farrakhan has accused Jews of controlling the media, government, and global economy, along with being behind the Atlantic slave trade, Jim Crow laws, and black oppression in general. He regularly calls Jews "Satanic" and has repeatedly praised Adolf Hitler as a “very great man.”

The Simon Wiesenthal Center included some of Farrakhan's comments on its list of the Top 10 antisemitic slurs in 2012.

"Gutter religion" remarks
In June 1984, after returning from a visit to Libya, Farrakhan delivered a sermon that was recorded by a Chicago Sun-Times reporter. A transcript from part of the sermon was published in The New York Times:

Farrakhan has repeatedly denied referring to Judaism as a "gutter religion" by explaining that he was instead referring to what he believed was the Israeli Government's use of Judaism as a political tool. In a June 18, 1997, letter to a former Wall Street Journal editor Jude Wanniski he stated:

Adolf Hitler and the Holocaust
In response to Farrakhan's speech, Nathan Pearlmutter, then Chair of the Anti-Defamation League, referred to Farrakhan as the new "Black Hitler" and Village Voice journalist Nat Hentoff also characterized the NOI leader as a "Black Hitler"  while he was a guest on a New York radio talk-show.

In response, Farrakhan announced during a March 11, 1984, speech which was broadcast on a Chicago radio station:

At a later meeting of the Nation of Islam at Madison Square Garden in 1985, Farrakhan said of the Jews: "And don't you forget, when it's God who puts you in the ovens, it's forever!" He has also claimed that German Jews financed the Holocaust in a speech at the Mosque Maryam, Chicago in March 1995: "German Jews financed Hitler right here in America...International bankers financed Hitler and poor Jews died while big Jews were at the root of what you call the Holocaust". Almost three years later at a Saviors' Day gathering in the same city, he said: "The Jews have been so bad at politics they lost half their population in the Holocaust. They thought they could trust in Hitler, and they helped him get the Third Reich on the road."

Incidents and comments since 2002
On March 23, 2002, Farrakhan visited Kahal Kadosh Shaare Shalom in Kingston, Jamaica, which was his first visit to a synagogue, in an attempt to repair his relationship with the Jewish community. Farrakhan was accepted to speak at Shaare Shalom in the native country of his father, after being rejected to appear at American synagogues, many of whom had fear of sending the wrong signals to the Jewish community.

Farrakhan made antisemitic comments during his May 16–17, 2013 visit to Detroit in which he accused President Obama of having “surrounded himself with Satan…members of the Jewish community". Jews, according to Farrakhan, "have mastered the civilization now, but they’ve mastered it in evil". In a weekly lecture series titled "The Time and What Must Be Done", which began during January 2013, he prophesied the downfall of the United States soon and said the country faced divine punishment if his warnings were rejected.

In March 2015, Farrakhan accused "Israelis and Zionist Jews" of being involved in the September 11 attacks. (In 2012 and 2017 speeches, he said the American government were behind 9/11.) In his Saviours' Day speech in February 2018, Farrakhan described "the powerful Jews" as his enemy and approvingly cited President Richard Nixon and the Reverend Billy Graham's derogatory comments about Jews "grip on the media", and claimed they are responsible for "all of this filth and degenerate behavior that Hollywood is putting out turning men into women and women into men".
On February 20, 2019, at the Nation of Islam's annual Saviour's Day gathering, Farrakhan declared, "I represent the Messiah. I represent the Jesus and I am that Jesus." 
		 
A three-hour speech by Farrakhan on July 4, 2020 was carried by Revolt TV's YouTube channel, He claimed Jonathan Greenblatt, the head of the anti-bigotry nonprofit Anti-Defamation League, is Satan, and described Alan Dershowitz as "a skillful deceiver" and "Satan masquerading as a lawyer". Greenblatt responded in a tweet: "This is routine for Farrakhan—give him a platform, he never fails to espouse hatred." Farrakhan made the factually inaccurate claim that Jews are required by their religion to poison prophets and claimed Jews had "broken their covenant relationship with God" and were the "enemy of God". However, in his speech, Farrakhan also said: “If you really think I hate the Jewish people, you don’t know me at all,” adding “[I’ve never] uttered the words of death to the Jewish people.” As of July 15, 2020, Farrakhan's speech had been viewed more than 1.2 million times on YouTube.

Activities and statements since 2005

Hurricane Katrina
In comments in 2005, Farrakhan stated that there was a  hole under one of the key levees that failed in New Orleans following Hurricane Katrina. He implied that the levee's destruction was a deliberate attempt to wipe out the population of the largely black sections within the city. Farrakhan later said that New Orleans Mayor Ray Nagin told him of the crater during a meeting in Dallas, Texas.

Farrakhan further claimed that the fact the levee broke the day after Hurricane Katrina is proof that the destruction of the levee was not a natural occurrence. Farrakhan has raised additional questions and has called for federal investigations into the source of the levee break. He also asserted that the hurricane was "God's way of punishing America for its warmongering and racism".

Experts including the Independent Levee Investigation Team (ILIT) from the University of California, Berkeley have countered his accusations. The report from the ILIT said "The findings of this panel are that the over-topping of the levees by flood waters, the often sub-standard materials used to shore up the levees, and the age of the levees contributed to these scour holes found at many of the sites of levee breaks after the hurricane."

Relations with Barack Obama
In 2008, Farrakhan publicly criticized the United States and supported then-Senator Barack Obama who was campaigning at the time to become the president of the United States of America. Farrakhan and Obama had met at least once before that time.

The Obama campaign quickly responded to convey his distance from the minister. "Senator Obama has been clear in his objections to Farrakhan's past pronouncements and has not solicited the minister's support," said Obama spokesman Bill Burton. Obama "rejected and denounced" Farrakhan's support during an NBC presidential candidate debate.

Following the 2008 presidential election, Farrakhan explained, during a BET television interview, that he was "careful" never to endorse Obama during his campaign. "I talked about him—but, in very beautiful and glowing terms, stopping short of endorsing him. And unfortunately, or fortunately, however we look at it, the media said I 'endorsed' him, so he renounced my so-called endorsement and support. But that didn't stop me from supporting him."

On May 28, 2011, Farrakhan, speaking at the American Clergy Leadership Conference, lambasted Obama over the wars in Iraq and Afghanistan and the intervention in Libya, calling him an "assassin" and a "murderer." "We voted for our brother Barack, a beautiful human being with a sweet heart," Farrakhan said, in a video that was widely shared on the Internet. "But he has turned into someone else," Farrakhan told the crowd. "Now he's an assassin."

Dianetics
A connection between the Church of Scientology and the Nation of Islam is reported to date from the late 1990s when Farrakhan was introduced to its teachings by the musician Isaac Hayes, who was the Church of Scientology's International spokesman for its World Literacy Crusade.

On May 8, 2010, Farrakhan publicly announced his embrace of Dianetics and has actively encouraged Nation of Islam members to undergo auditing from the Church. Although he has stressed that he is not a Scientologist, but only a believer in Dianetics and the theories related to it, the Church honored Farrakhan previously during its 2006 Ebony Awakening awards ceremony (which he did not attend). Farrakhan has also urged European Americans to join the Church of Scientology, stating in his 2011 Saviour's Day speech, "All white people should flock to [Scientology founder] L. Ron Hubbard." Reportedly, according to the SPLC, Hubbard was a racist who supported the apartheid regime in South Africa.

Since the announcement in 2010, the Nation of Islam has been hosting its own Dianetic courses and its own graduation ceremonies. At the third such ceremony, which was  held on Saviours Day 2013, it was announced that nearly 8,500 members of the organisation had undergone Dianetic auditing. The Organisation announced it had graduated 1,055 auditors and had delivered 82,424 hours of auditing. The graduation ceremony was certified by the Church of Scientology, and the Nation of Islam members received official certification. The ceremony was attended by Shane Woodruff, vice-president of the Church of Scientology's Celebrity Centre International. He stated that "The unfolding story of the Nation of Islam and Dianetics is bold, it is determined and it is absolutely committed to restoring freedom and wiping hell from the face of this planet."

Praise for Donald Trump
During the 2016 Republican Party presidential primaries, Farrakhan praised Republican candidate Donald Trump as the only candidate "who has stood in front of the Jewish community and said 'I don’t want your money.'" While he declined to endorse Trump outright, he said of Trump, "I like what I'm looking at." In 2018, Farrakhan again praised Trump for "destroying every enemy that was an enemy of our rise". He included the Department of Justice and the Federal Bureau of Investigation (FBI) in this group.

Conservative pundits Candace Owens and Glenn Beck both took note of Farrakhan's position, with Owens saying, while she did not "endorse Farrakhan’s views," it remained a "really big deal" that Farrakhan had "aligned himself with Trump's administration" and Beck declaring that "the enemy of my enemy is my friend" and urged "reconciliation" between conservatives and Farrakhan.

Controversies

Farrakhan has been the center of much controversy with critics saying that his political views and comments are antisemitic or racist. Farrakhan has categorically denied these charges and stated that much of America's perception of him has been shaped by the media.

Malcolm X's death
Many, including Malcolm X's family, have accused Farrakhan of being involved in the plot to assassinate Malcolm X. For many years, Betty Shabazz, the widow of Malcolm X, harbored resentment toward the Nation of Islam—and Farrakhan in particular—for what she felt was their role in the assassination of her husband. In a 1993 speech, Farrakhan seemed to confirm that the Nation of Islam was responsible for the assassination:

We don't give a damn about no white man law if you attack what we love. And frankly, it ain't none of your business. What do you got to say about it? Did you teach Malcolm? Did you make Malcolm? Did you clean up Malcolm? Did you put Malcolm out before the world? Was Malcolm your traitor or ours? And if we dealt with him like a nation deals with a traitor, what the hell business is it of yours? You just shut your mouth, and stay out of it. Because in the future, we gonna become a nation. And a nation gotta be able to deal with traitors and cutthroats and turncoats. The white man deals with his. The Jews deal with theirs.

During a 1994 interview, Gabe Pressman asked Shabazz whether Farrakhan "had anything to do" with Malcolm X's death. She replied: "Of course, yes. Nobody kept it a secret. It was a badge of honor. Everybody talked about it, yes."

In a 60 Minutes interview that aired during May 2000, Farrakhan stated that some of the things he said may have led to the assassination of Malcolm X. "I may have been complicit in words that I spoke", he said. "I acknowledge that and regret that any word that I have said caused the loss of life of a human being." A few days later Farrakhan denied that he "ordered the assassination" of Malcolm X, although he again acknowledged that he "created the atmosphere that ultimately led to Malcolm X's assassination."

Allegations of sexism
Farrakhan received sexual discrimination complaints filed with a New York state agency when he banned women from attending a speech he gave in a city-owned theater in 1993. The next year he gave a speech only women could attend. In his speech for women, as The New York Times reported,

Mr. Farrakhan urged the women to embrace his formula for a successful family. He encouraged them to put husbands and children ahead of their careers, shun tight, short skirts, stay off welfare and reject abortion. He also stressed the importance of cooking and cleaning and urged women not to abandon homemaking for careers. 'You're just not going to be happy unless there is happiness in the home,' Mr. Farrakhan said at the Mason Cathedral Church of God in Christ in the Dorchester section, not far from the Roxbury neighborhood where he was raised by a single mother. 'Your professional lives can't satisfy your soul like a good, loving man.'

Muammar Gaddafi
In 1985, Farrakhan obtained working capital in the amount of $5 million, in the form of an interest-free loan from Libya's Islamic Call Society to be repaid within 18 months which was to be used to create a toiletries firm with black employees. Libyan President Muammar Gaddafi had also offered Farrahkan guns to begin a black nation. Farrakhan said that he told Gaddafi that he preferred an economic investment in black America.

In January 1996, when Farrakhan visited Libya, Gaddafi pledged giving him a gift of $1 billion and a personal award of $250,000. As economic activity between the two countries had been restricted by the US government since 1986 following allegations of Libya's connection to terrorism, the financial transfer was blocked. It was unclear if Gaddafi would have been in a position to finance the money transfer.

At the time of the wider uprisings in the Arab world and the Tsunami in Japan in a Chicago press conference on March 31, 2011, Farrakhan said President Obama's action in supporting the rebels in Libya were going to advance the arrival of UFOs, or divine spaceships, as punishments for black sufferings. Depicting Obama as engulfed by the people surrounding him, he said: "The stupid mistake that we make is to think that the president is the supreme power. Never was. Money is the power in America. … All of you know what I’m talking about, Zionist control of the government of the United States of America." When Gaddafi was killed in October 2011, Farrakhan blamed Obama's advisors whom he called "wicked demons".

Social media
Farrakhan lost his verified status on his Twitter posts in June 2018, denying him full verification, after asserting the Harvey Weinstein scandal was about "Jewish power". A contributor to the Tablet website, Yair Rosenberg, objected to a potential suspension as "erasing hate from social media doesn’t make it go away, it just makes it easier to ignore" making them more difficult to dismiss as "inconsequential". The following October, Twitter said that it would not suspend Farrakhan's account after a tweet he posted compared Jews to termites as he had not broken the site's rules. After a Twitter rule change on hateful conduct in July 2019, the tweet ("I’m not an anti-Semite. I’m anti-Termite") was removed.

At the beginning of May 2019, Farrakhan was banned from Facebook, along with other prominent individuals considered by the company to be extremists, with antisemitism believed to be the reason for Farrakhan's removal.

During a speech at Saint Sabina Catholic Church in Chicago a week later, Farrakhan stated he had "never been arrested" for "drunken driving" and asked: "What have I done that you would hate me like that?" The Nation of Islam said his speech was Farrakhan's response to the "public outrage over the unprecedented and unwarranted lifetime ban" from Facebook. He insisted he was neither a misogynist nor a homophobe and that: "I do not hate Jewish people". Archbishop of Chicago Cardinal Blase J. Cupich condemned the decision of the church in allowing Farrakhan to speak there.

Other issues

Musical career
When Farrakhan first joined the NOI, he was asked by Elijah Muhammad to put aside his musical career as a calypso singer. After 42 years, Farrakhan decided to take up the violin once more primarily due to the urging of prominent classical musician Sylvia Olden Lee.

On April 17, 1993, Farrakhan made his return concert debut with performances of the Violin Concerto in E Minor by Felix Mendelssohn. Farrakhan intimated that his performance of a concerto by a Jewish composer was, in part, an effort to heal a rift between him and the Jewish community. (Mendelssohn's family converted to Christianity). The New York Times music critic Bernard Holland reported that Farrakhan's performance was somewhat flawed due to years of neglect, but "nonetheless Mr. Farrakhan's sound is that of the authentic player. It is wide, deep and full of the energy that makes the violin gleam."'

In 2021, to celebrate the 250th anniversary of Beethoven's birth, Farrakhan performed Violin Concerto in D Major Op. 61 with the New World Symphony.

Health
Farrakhan announced that he was seriously ill in a letter on September 11, 2006, that was directed to his staff, Nation of Islam members, and supporters. The letter, published in The Final Call newspaper, said that doctors in Cuba had discovered a peptic ulcer. According to the letter subsequent infections caused Farrakhan to lose , and he urged the Nation of Islam leadership to carry on while he recovered.

Farrakhan was released from his five-week hospital stay on January 28, 2007, after major abdominal surgery. The operation was performed to correct damage caused by side effects of a radioactive "seed" implantation procedure that he received years earlier to successfully treat prostate cancer.

Following his hospital stay, Farrakhan released a "Message of Appreciation" to supporters and well-wishers and weeks later delivered the keynote address at the Nation of Islam's annual convention in Detroit.

In December 2013, Farrakhan announced that he had not appeared publicly for two months because he had suffered a heart attack in October.

Succession 
It is unknown who will lead the Nation of Islam after Farrakhan's death. Ishmael Muhammad has been speculated to be a potential successor. Social media personality "Brother Ben X" has informally positioned himself as an heir to Farrakhan. Before 1993, Khallid Muhammad was "the most likely heir apparent".

Awards
 2005, a Black Entertainment Television (BET) poll voted Farrakhan the 'Person of the Year'.

See also

 Nation of Islam and antisemitism
 African American–Jewish relations
 Black theology
 Black separatism
 The Hate That Hate Produced
 The Secret Relationship Between Blacks and Jews
 Mustapha Farrakhan Jr.
 1972 Harlem mosque incident

References

Further reading

External links

 Nation of Islam's Official Louis Farrakhan Bio Sketch
 Final Call Newspaper, founded by Louis Farrakhan

Louis Farrakhan
1933 births
Living people
20th-century apocalypticists
20th-century Islamic religious leaders
21st-century apocalypticists
21st-century Islamic religious leaders
Activists for African-American civil rights
Activists from New York (state)
African and Black nationalists
Anti-white racism in the United States
African-American former Christians
African-American Muslims
African-American religious leaders
American conspiracy theorists
American former Protestants
American Muslim activists
American people of Jamaican descent
American people of Saint Kitts and Nevis descent
American social activists
American social commentators
Anti-Christian sentiment in the United States
Antisemitism in the United States
Anti-Zionism in the United States
Black supremacists
Calypsonians
Converts to Islam from Protestantism
Discrimination against LGBT people in the United States
English High School of Boston alumni
Former Anglicans
 
Nation of Islam religious leaders
Non-interventionism
People from Boston
People from the Bronx
People from Chicago
Religious leaders from Massachusetts
Religious leaders from New York City
Religious leaders from Chicago